The King of Fighters '98: The Slugfest, known in Japan as The King of Fighters '98: Dream Match Never Ends (KOF '98), is a fighting game released by SNK for the Neo Geo arcade and home consoles in 1998. It is the fifth game in The King of Fighters series. It was advertised by SNK as a "special edition" of the series, as it featured most of the characters who appeared in the previous games (from KOF '94 to '97).

KOF '98 was also released for the Neo-Geo CD in 1998 and for the PlayStation in Japan in 1999. A Dreamcast version titled The King of Fighters: Dream Match 1999 was released in 1999, featuring remade 3D backgrounds. The game was also made for the PlayStation 2 as The King of Fighters '98: Ultimate Match (KOF '98UM), which expands the number of playable characters, further tweaks the gameplay and features a third fighting style option.

Gameplay 

The gameplay does not differ much from the previous game, KOF '97. Like in KOF '97, the player has a choice between two playing styles: Advance and Extra, with a few slight modifications to Advanced mode (unlike in KOF '97, the character will resume to normal if the player performs a Super Special Move in MAX state). This time when one character loses a round, the losing team is given a handicap in its favor. In Advanced mode, this means that the players stock capacity for Power Gauges is increased by one. In Extra mode, the time it takes to charge ones power gauge to maximum level is shortened, and the maximum remaining health requirement for a MAX Super Special Move is increased.

Characters

All the regular characters from the previous game return, along with several characters from preceding installments such as Vice and Mature (Iori's teammates from KOF '96), the American Sports Team (Heavy D!, Lucky Glauber, and Brian Battler) from KOF '94, and the Old Men Team (or Veteran Fighters Team) composed of Heidern, Takuma Sakazaki, and Saisyu Kusanagi, all characters whose last appearances were in KOF '95. Rugal Bernstein from KOF '94 also returns as a Team Edit character, with his alter-ego Omega Rugal (the cyborg version of Rugal from KOF '95) serving as the game's final boss in the Single Player Mode. Shingo Yabuki (who originally appeared in KOF '97) continues as a Team Edit character, but also appears as a mid-boss character during the Arcade Mode. Additionally, the game includes EX versions of certain characters, i.e., alternate versions of characters who use movesets from previous games: Joe Higashi, Ryo Sakazaki, Yuri Sakazaki and Robert Garcia are based on their KOF '94 movesets, whereas Kyo Kusanagi is based on his KOF '95 moveset and Terry Bogard, Andy Bogard, Mai Shiranui and Billy Kane are based on their Real Bout Fatal Fury 2: The Newcomers movesets.

Japan Team
 Kyo Kusanagi
 Benimaru Nikaido
 Goro Daimon

Fatal Fury Team
 Terry Bogard
 Andy Bogard
 Joe Higashi

Art of Fighting Team
 Ryo Sakazaki
 Robert Garcia
 Yuri Sakazaki

Ikari Team
 Leona Heidern
 Ralf Jones
 Clark Still

Psycho Soldier Team
 Athena Asamiya
 Sie Kensou
 Chin Gentsai

Women Fighters Team
 Chizuru Kagura
 Mai Shiranui
 King

Korea Team
 Kim Kaphwan
 Chang Koehan
 Choi Bounge
Orochi Team / Awakened Orochi Team
 Yashiro Nanakase / Orochi Yashiro
 Shermie / Orochi Shermie
 Chris / Orochi Chris

Outlaw Team ('97 Special Team)
 Ryuji Yamazaki
 Blue Mary
 Billy Kane

Yagami Team
 Iori Yagami
 Mature
 Vice

Masters Team
 Heidern
 Takuma Sakazaki
 Saisyu Kusanagi

American Sports Team
 Heavy D
 Lucky Glauber
 Brian Battler

Single Entry
 Rugal Bernstein
 Shingo Yabuki

Boss
 Omega Rugal (New Character)

Development
In The King of Fighters '96, several moves from Kyo Kusanagi were changed in order to adapt him to the new game system. However, the original moveset was still popular among gamers and as such, an alternative version of Kyo was added to The King of Fighters '97. The introduction of this version was noted to be "a hit" within gamers, the staff kept adding new alternative versions of other characters in KOF '98. Since this game did not have a storyline, the SNK staff decided to return Rugal Bernstein as the boss character noting that "he's the only character who truly represents the ultimate KOF boss." Additionally, some of his special moves were redesigned, which the staff found to have made him the strongest version of Rugal as well as one of their favorites.

Release

KOF '98 was originally released for arcades on July 23, 1998. It was also released for the Neo Geo AES on September 23, 1998, the Neo-Geo CD on December 23, 1998, and the PlayStation on March 25, 1999. The PlayStation version was published in North America by Agetec, becoming the first PlayStation installment in the series to be released outside Japan since The King of Fighters '95. The original game is also included in The King of Fighters Collection: Orochi Saga compilation released in North America and the PAL region for the PlayStation 2, PlayStation Portable and Wii (the game was not included in the Japanese Orochi Hen compilation). The game was later re-released for iOS and Android.

Dream Match
A Dreamcast version was also released on June 24, 1999, under the title The King of Fighters: Dream Match 1999, reflecting the year the version was released. It came out in North America on September 30, 1999. It features remade 3D backdrops and runs at 60 frames per second. This version also featured its own anime style intro, produced by the studio; Digimation K.K., before it merged to become part of the studio Gonzo, a few years later.

Ultimate Match

KOF '98 was updated under a standalone title of The King of Fighters '98: Ultimate Match (KOF '98UM) released in 2008, ten years after the original games release. It was released in Japan as an arcade game for the Taito Type X hardware in March 2008. The PlayStation 2 version released on June 26, and was also published on the NeoGeo Online Collection The Best on June 18, 2008. The game was released in North America by Ignition Entertainment on March 3, 2009. It was released in Europe on June 10, 2009. A version for the IGS PolyGame Master 2 arcade hardware was also released in 2009, which was called The King of Fighters '98: Ultimate Match Hero.

Ultimate Match includes additional characters not featured in the original version of the game, such as Eiji Kisaragi from KOF '95, along with Kasumi Todoh and the Boss Team (composed of Geese Howard, Wolfgang Krauser, and Mr. Big) from KOF '96, as well as the final boss characters Goenitz and Orochi, essentially including all the characters featured in the KOF series prior to KOF '98. New moves were added to the USA Sports Team to improve their playability, and EX versions of certain characters not featured in the original version were added, namely King with her Art of Fighting 2 moveset, and Ryuji Yamazaki, Blue Mary and Geese Howard with their Real Bout Fatal Fury 2: The Newcomers movesets. The Orochi versions of Leona and Iori Yagami are also playable, and both also appear as optional mid-bosses alongside Eiji, Kasumi, Shingo and original version of Rugal in the Arcade Mode. New stages were added to the game such as China and Hong Kong to show appreciation for KOF'''s high popularity in such regions; it is also the only fighting game to feature an accurate representation of Saudi Arabia in one stage, as the country was a major market for the NEO GEO line in the early 1990s. A third fighting style is also introduced in addition to Advance and Extra, dubbed "Ultimate" mode. Ultimate mode is a customizable style that allows the player to choose between features from Advance or Extra mode, such as which kind of Power Gauge to use. It also includes a 'Neo Geo' mode, directly ported from the Neo Geo console.

A mobile game based on Ultimate Match, called The King of Fighters '98UM OL, was released by Chinese company Ourpalm for the iOS and Android platforms on July 9, 2016.

An updated version titled The King of Fighters '98: Ultimate Match Final Edition, featuring balance changes for most characters, was released for Microsoft Windows on Steam on December 16, 2014, and on GOG.com on June 1, 2018. This version came to the PlayStation 4 on June 21, 2022.

Reception

In Japan, Game Machine listed The King of Fighters '98 on their September 1, 1998 issue as being the most-successful arcade game of the month. According to Famitsu, the AES version sold over 22,651 copies in its first week on the market.

During its release week, the Dreamcast version of the game sold 58,354 copies in Japan. As of 2004, the sales increased to 104,049. Famitsu magazine scored the Dreamcast version of KOF '98 a 30 out of 40, and GameRankings gave it a 71% based on a total of 18 reviews.

Various reviewers from video game publications have commented on KOF '98. While reviewing the compilation The King of Fighters: The Orochi Saga, Matt Edwards from Eurogamer noted KOF '98 to be the most enjoyable game from the collection as well as the most famous game from the series "that really made people stand up and take an interest in the series. We'd disagree in favor of some of the later games, but for its time KOF '98 was reasonably well balanced for a 2D fighter. And there's no denying it was a blast." The game also received praise by 1UP.com writer Richard Li who found it to be the most balanced game from the KOF series due to the fact it improved the game mechanics from the previous titles. Jeremy Dunham from IGN gave the game an 8.4, praising, apart from the gameplay and characters, the graphics, the music as well as the background designs added for the Dreamcast version. However, he was disappointed with the lack of story in the game, noting the ones from previous games to be very entertaining. GameSpot's Jeff Gerstmann found it to be one of the best 2D fighting games, noting that although new players may find it hard to play due to the difficulty in executing various special moves and how difficult the opponent AI is. Although Andy Chien from Gaming Age found that the Dreamcast port of the game was well done since it does not have the disadvantages that it had in other consoles, he noted it "could have been a lot better." He also found that the game had a bug when he tried to perform a special move from Mai Shiranui, which unlike the other versions, is very inconsistent.

Tom Russo reviewed the Dreamcast version of the game for Next Generation, rating it two stars out of five, and stated that "Not bad, but with so many other high-quality fighters available, this one only makes sense for players nostalgic for old NeoGeo fighting games."

GameRankings gave Ultimate Match a 77% based on 14 reviews for the PlayStation 2 version and 74% based on 5 reviews for the Xbox 360 version. Metacritic gave it a 73 out of 100 for both the PlayStation 2 and Xbox 360 versions based on 11 reviews and 4 reviews respectively. Various publications for video games and other media have commented on Ultimate Match with IGN writer Ryan Clements giving it a 7.8, saying that probably this game should only be recommended to fans of The King of Fighters due to how old its graphics are as well as the little balance it has with 60 characters being playable. James Mielke from 1UP.com complained on how the game is very similar to KOF '98, but found the controls to be comfortable and intuitive for any fans of 2D fighting games. However, Heath Hooker from GameZone found that the gameplay and sound from the game make up for the graphics even though there is not much difference between KOF '98 and KOF '98: Ultimate Match. In 2013, KOF '98 Ultimate Match was ranked as the 15th best arcade game of the 1990s by Complex, who also called it "possibly the greatest SNK fighting game of them all," and included it on their list of 25 best 2D fighting games of all time in 2013.

In 2017, the Chinese mobile game King of Fighters '98UM OL'' grossed  in Japan.

Notes

References

External links 
  
 The King of Fighters '98 at GameFAQs
 The King of Fighters '98 at Giant Bomb
 The King of Fighters '98 at Killer List of Videogames
 The King of Fighters '98 at MobyGames

1998 video games
2D fighting games
ACA Neo Geo games
Android (operating system) games
Arcade video games
D4 Enterprise games
Dreamcast games
Fighting games used at the Super Battle Opera tournament
IOS games
Multiplayer and single-player video games
Neo Geo games
Neo Geo CD games
NESiCAxLive games
Nintendo Switch games
PlayStation (console) games
PlayStation 2 games
PlayStation 4 games
PlayStation Network games
SNK games
SNK Playmore games
The King of Fighters games
Fighting games
Video games set in Japan
Video games set in China
Video games set in Spain
Video games set in the Middle East
Video games set in the United States
Video games set in South Korea
Video games set in Hong Kong
Video games set in Taiwan
Video games with AI-versus-AI modes
Virtual Console games
Windows games
Xbox 360 Live Arcade games
Xbox One games
Video games developed in Japan
Hamster Corporation games
Agetec games